Jan Szpunar (30 October 1952 – 17 March 2017) was a Polish biathlete. He competed in the 20 km individual event at the 1976 Winter Olympics.

References

1952 births
2017 deaths
Polish male biathletes
Olympic biathletes of Poland
Biathletes at the 1976 Winter Olympics
People from Tatra County